The Best of Elvis Costello: The First 10 Years is a compilation album by Elvis Costello released in 2007, consisting of songs taken from the early years of his discography, compiled by Costello himself.

Reception

Stephen Thomas Erlewine of AllMusic says that this collection "is quite similar to the last previous single-disc collection, the 1994 Ryko/Demon set The Very Best of Elvis Costello and the Attractions", with 19 of the 22 tracks the same. The three omitted tracks are "New Amsterdam", "Watch Your Step", and "Love Field." Those songs are replaced by different choices in this set with "New Lace Sleeves", "Almost Blue", and "(The Angels Wanna Wear My) Red Shoes", resulting in the Goodbye Cruel World album being unrepresented on the new compilation. "With these three songs rubbing shoulders with...all the other usual suspects, The Best of Elvis Costello: The First 10 Years winds up being the best single-disc summary and introduction to Costello's prime years."

Track listing

Chart positions

References

2007 greatest hits albums
Elvis Costello compilation albums
Hip-O Records compilation albums